Gordon Thomson (born March 2, 1945) is a Canadian actor widely known for his role as Adam Carrington on the 1980s American prime time soap opera Dynasty.

Early life
Thomson began acting while studying English at McGill University in Montreal. One of his earliest roles was "Sir Robin the Brave" in the 1971 version of the Muppets' The Frog Prince. He went on to appear in Canadian television and stage roles, including a stint in Godspell opposite Gilda Radner, Martin Short, and Eugene Levy. In his twenties he also worked as a catalogue model to supplement his acting earnings.

Career
His first main TV role was as Michael Stewart Jr. on the Canadian television serial High Hopes in 1978. He then appeared as Egyptologist Aristotle Benedict White on the ABC daytime soap opera Ryan's Hope from 1981 to 1982.

Having received acclaim for stage performances in productions including Love's Labour's Lost, Godspell and Joe Orton's Loot, Thomson advanced to the ABC Talent Development Program. After auditioning for a police series pilot called Callahan, he was instead cast as Dynasty Adam Carrington. Thomson debuted on Dynasty in October 1982, and remained with the series until its cancellation in May 1989. This role brought Thomson nomination for Golden Globe Award for Best Supporting Actor – Series, Miniseries or Television Film in 1988. During the 1985–1986 season, Thomson also appeared in three episodes of the Dynasty spin-off, The Colbys. 

After Dynasty, Thomson returned to daytime soaps. In 1990, he joined the now defunct series Santa Barbara (as the third actor to portray the character Mason Capwell). His commitment to Santa Barbara left him unable to reprise his role as Adam Carrington in the TV miniseries Dynasty: The Reunion (1991), and he was subsequently replaced by British actor Robin Sachs. Thomson had roles on The Young and the Restless, Passions, Sunset Beach, and in 2009, he appeared on Days of Our Lives.

Thomson appeared in eight different series produced by Aaron Spelling: Dynasty, Fantasy Island, Finder of Lost Loves, Glitter, The Love Boat, The Colbys, Beverly Hills, 90210 and Sunset Beach. He guest-starred in a variety of other series such as Murder, She Wrote, The Nanny and Silk Stalkings.

In recent years, Thomson reunited with his Dynasty co-stars in two non-fiction television specials; After Dynasty (part of the UK's After They Were Famous series) in 2002, and Dynasty Reunion: Catfights & Caviar in 2006. That same year, he had small roles in the feature films Poseidon (a remake of The Poseidon Adventure), and the Academy Award-nominated Little Miss Sunshine. From 2011, to 2014, Thomson appeared on the soap opera web series DeVanity, and in 2015 began starring as Maxmillian Winterthorne in the soap opera web series Winterthorne. In 2017, he played the role of Parker Rutledge, a ruthless Washington power player, in the Passionflix romantic drama film Afterburn Aftershock, based on The New York Times bestselling novel of the same name by Sylvia Day.

Thomson guest hosted for Britain's ITV network on their then breakfast show Good Morning Britain, for which he covered celebrity events such as Wimbledon and Royal Ascot.

Personal life
On September 25, 2017, Thomson came out as gay.

References

External links

1945 births
Living people
Male actors from Ottawa
Canadian male film actors
Canadian male stage actors
Canadian male soap opera actors
Canadian male television actors
Canadian expatriates in the United States
Canadian gay actors